Joel Jeffrey (born 12 March 2002) is a professional Australian rules footballer who plays for the Gold Coast Football Club in the Australian Football League (AFL).

Early life
Jeffrey was born into a Darwin-based family of Indigenous Australian descent from the Northern Territory (Wulwulam) and Queensland (Kukatj). His father, Russell, was a professional Australian rules footballer who played at the highest level for St Kilda before relocating to the Gold Coast to continue his AFL career with the Brisbane Bears. Following his retirement, Russell returned to Darwin to play for Wanderers and coached Palmerston to back-to-back NTFL premierships in 2001–02. He was inducted into the AFLNT Hall of Fame in 2010.

Joel began playing junior football for Palmerston and later switched to the Wanderers Football Club where he made his Men's Premier League debut for the club in 2018 at 16 years of age. In June 2019, at 17 years of age, Jeffrey made his senior NEAFL debut for the NT Thunder at TIO Stadium and kicked a goal in his first game. He was also selected to represent the Allies at the 2019 AFL Under 18 Championships as a bottom ager and intended to relocate to the Gold Coast in 2020 to take part in the Suns' academy program on a full-time basis until the COVID-19 pandemic eliminated that possibility. In December 2020, Jeffrey was drafted to the Gold Coast Suns via their academy access.

AFL career
Jeffrey spent the first half of the 2021 season playing for Gold Coast in the VFL and notably kicked a winning goal after the siren to defeat the Sydney Swans after marking the ball one handed with seconds to go in the game. He impressed again a month later with a 9-goal, best on ground performance in the VFL, which earned him an AFL debut the following week against the Melbourne Demons at Metricon Stadium. In his sixth AFL game, Jeffrey remarkably kicked five goals against the Western Bulldogs, which included a Goal of the Year nomination that involved an intercept and a snap over his head. He was awarded a 2022 AFL Rising Star nomination for his performance.

Statistics
 Statistics are correct to the end of round 3, 2022

|- style="background-color: #EAEAEA"
! scope="row" style="text-align:center" | 2021
|
| 40 || 4 || 2 || 4 || 19 || 6 || 25 || 6 || 4 || 0.5 || 1.0 || 4.8 || 1.5 || 6.3 || 1.5 || 1.0
|-
! scope="row" style="text-align:center" | 2022
|
| 40 || 0 || 4|| 1 || – || – || – || – || – || – || – || – || – || – || – || –
|- class="sortbottom"
! colspan=3| Career
! 4
! 2
! 4
! 19
! 6
! 25
! 6
! 4
! 0.5
! 1.0
! 4.8
! 1.5
! 6.3
! 1.5
! 1.0
|}

References

External links

2002 births
Living people
Gold Coast Football Club players
Indigenous Australian players of Australian rules football
Australian rules footballers from the Northern Territory